The 10th Pan American Games were held in Indianapolis, Indiana, United States from 7 to 23 August 1987. The Caymans Islands made its debut at this edition of the Pan American Games.

Results by event

See also
 Cayman Islands at the 1986 Commonwealth Games
 Cayman Islands at the 1988 Summer Olympics

Nations at the 1987 Pan American Games
P
1987